Stanley Waita (born 10 October 1979 in Auki) is a retired Solomon Islands footballer who played as a midfielder. Since January 2018 he is the head coach of the Solomon Islands under-17.

Club career
Waita played in the Central League for Wairarapa United in 2006. The Solomon Islands midfielder transferred to Ngaruawahia United where he played a key role in the club's promotion charge scoring ten goals in eleven matches for the club. Waita played in the ASB Premiership for Waikato FC and completed the 2007-2008 Lotto Sport Italia NRFL Division 1 seasons with Ngaruawahia United.

Waita returned to the Solomon Islands in mid-2008 before joining Papua New Guineans Hekari in 2009. In May 2010, he won the Oceania Champions League with Hekari United.

International career
He has also represented the senior Solomon Islands national football team, making his debut in 2000 and collecting over 30 caps since.

Honours
Oceania Champions League: 1
 2010

References

1979 births
Living people
Solomon Islands footballers
Solomon Islands international footballers
Nadi F.C. players
Waikato FC players
Expatriate association footballers in New Zealand
Expatriate footballers in Papua New Guinea
Expatriate footballers in Fiji
Expatriate footballers in Vanuatu
Solomon Islands expatriate sportspeople in New Zealand
Solomon Islands expatriate sportspeople in Papua New Guinea
Solomon Islands expatriate sportspeople in Fiji
Solomon Islands expatriate sportspeople in Vanuatu
Association football midfielders
2000 OFC Nations Cup players
2002 OFC Nations Cup players
2004 OFC Nations Cup players